The Tunnel is a collaborative album by American DJs Funkmaster Flex and Big Kap. It was released on December 7, 1999 via Def Jam Recordings.

Recording sessions took place at Mirror Image Times Square, at Madison Square Garden, at Quad Recording Studios, at Chung King Studios, at The Hit Factory, at Electric Lady Studios, at Sound On Sound, at Sony Music Studios, at Soundtrack Recording Studios, at Battery Studios and at Big Noise Studios in New York City, at Criteria Studios in Miami, at Enterprise Studios in California, at Erick Sermon Studios in Long Island, and at Cash Money Studios in New Orleans.

Production was handled by several record producers, including Rockwilder, Irv Gotti, Mannie Fresh, DJ Scratch, Funk Flex and Big Kap themselves. It features guest appearances from Beanie Sigel, 2Pac, Amil, Angie Martinez, B.G., Black Child, Caddillac Tah, Capone-N-Noreaga, DMX, Drag-On, Dr. Dre, Dutch & Spade, Eminem, Erick Sermon, Eve, Fatman Scoop, Ja Rule, Jay-Z, Jinx Da Juvy, Juvenile, Kool G Rap, Lady Luck, Lil' Kim, Lil Wayne, LL Cool J, Mary J. Blige, Memphis Bleek, Method Man, Nas, Nashawn, Notorious B.I.G., Pain In Da Ass, Prodigy, Raekwon, Redman, Ronnie Bumps,  Snoop Dogg, Swizz Beatz and The Lox.

The album peaked at number 35 on the Billboard 200, at number 3 on the Top R&B/Hip-Hop Albums, and was certified gold by the Recording Industry Association of America on March 7, 2000. It spawned two singles: "We In Here" with DMX, Eve, Styles P, Sheek Louch, Jadakiss, Drag-On and Swizz Beatz (b/w "Real G's" with Snoop Dogg), and "Confrontation" with Mary J. Blige (b/w "Ill Bomb" with LL Cool J).

Track listing 

Notes
 signifies a co-producer.

Sample credits
Track 1 contains a sample from "Bang Bang", written by Sonny Bono and performed by Vanilla Fudge
Track 3 contains a sample from "My Song", written by Charles Richard Cason and performed by Al Wilson
Track 5 contains samples from "Juicy Fruit", written and performed by James Mtume, "I'm Afraid the Masquerade is Over", written by Allie Wrubel and performed by David Porter, "Stay With Me", written and performed by DeBarge, "You Can't Turn Me Away", written by James Bedford, Sylvia Striplin and Roy Ayers and performed by Sylvia Striplin, "Do the James", written by Caliente Fredrick and Erik Rudnicki and performed by Super Lover Cee
Track 8 contains samples from "You Know You Got Soul", written by Eric Barrier, Charles Bobbit, James Brown, Bobby Byrd and William Griffin, and performed by Eric B. & Rakim
Track 9 contains excerpts from "Where My Homies", written by Lorenzo Grooms, Anthony Prendatt, Alphonse Constant, Patrick Harvey and performed by Ill Al Skratch
Track 15 contains a sample from "I'm Afraid the Masquerade is Over", written by Allie Wrubel and performed by David Porter
Track 16 contains samples from "Children's Story" and "Mona Lisa", written and performed by Slick Rick, "Seven Minutes of Funk", written by August Moon and Tyrone Thomas and performed by the Whole Darn Family, "Money, Cash, Hoes", written by Shawn Carter, Earl Simmons and Kasseem Dean and performed by Jay-Z, "Hip Hop Junkies", written and performed by Nice & Smooth
Track 18 contains a sample from "Live at the Barbeque", written and performed by Main Source
Track 19 contains a sample from "King of the Beats", written by Kurtis Mantronik and Touré Embden, and performed by Mantronix
Track 21 contains a sample from "Can I Get A...", written by Shawn Carter, Jeffrey Atkins, Irving Lorenzo and Robin Mays, and performed by Jay-Z

Charts

Weekly charts

Year-end charts

Certifications

References

External links

1998 albums
Collaborative albums
Funkmaster Flex albums
Def Jam Recordings albums
Albums produced by Irv Gotti
Albums produced by DJ Scratch
Albums produced by Rockwilder
Albums produced by Erick Sermon
Albums produced by Mannie Fresh
Albums recorded at Chung King Studios
Albums recorded at Electric Lady Studios
Albums recorded at Madison Square Garden